Aldrich is an Old English surname. Notable persons with that surname include:

Abby Aldrich (1874–1948), American philanthropist
Allison Aldrich (born 1988), American Paralympic volleyball player 
Ann Aldrich (1927–2010), American federal judge
Bailey Aldrich (1907–2002), American judge
Bess Streeter Aldrich (1881–1954), American author
Charles H. Aldrich (1850–1929), former Solicitor General of the United States
Charlie Aldrich (born 1918), American musician
Chester Hardy Aldrich (1862–1924), American politician from Nebraska
Chester Holmes Aldrich (1871–1940), American architect
Clark Aldrich, American author
Cole Aldrich (born 1988), American basketball player
Cyrus Aldrich (1808–1871), American politician
Daniel Aldrich (1918–1990), American educator
David Aldrich (1907–2002), American artist
David E. Aldrich (born 1963), American cinematographer
Doug Aldrich (born 1964), American guitarist
Edgar Aldrich (1848–1921), American judge
Erin Aldrich (born 1977), American athlete
Fred Aldrich (1904–1979), American actor
Frederick Aldrich (1907–2002), American marine biologist
Gary Aldrich (born 1945), American FBI agent
Hazen Aldrich (1797–1873), American religious figure
Henry Aldrich (1647–1710), English theologian and philosopher
Henry Carl Aldrich (1941–2005), American mycologist
Herman D. Aldrich (1801-1880), American businessman
Howard E. Aldrich (b. 1940s), American sociologist
J. Frank Aldrich (1853–1933), American politician
James Aldrich  (1810–1856), American editor and poet
James Aldrich (politician) (1850–1910), American judge and politician from South Carolina
Janet Aldrich, American actress and singer
Jay Aldrich (born 1961), American baseball player
Jeremy Aldrich (born 1977), American soccer player
John Aldrich (political scientist) (born 1947), American political scientist
John Aldrich (MP) (1520–1582), British Member of Parliament
John Merton Aldrich (1866–1934), zoologist and entomologist
John Warren Aldrich (1906–1995), American ornithologist
Julia Carter Aldrich (1834-1924), American author
Kate Aldrich (born 1973), American singer
Ki Aldrich (1916–1983), American football player
Larry Aldrich (1906–2001), American fashion designer
Lloyd Aldrich (1886–1967), American engineer
Louis Aldrich (1843–1901), American actor
Loyal Blaine Aldrich (1884–1965), American astronomer
Lucy Aldrich (1869–1955), American philanthropist
Mal Aldrich (1900–1986), American football player
Mariska Aldrich (1881–1965), American singer and actress
Mark Aldrich (1802–1873), American politician and mayor
Mary Jane Aldrich (1833–1909), American temperance reformer and lecturer
Michael Aldrich (1941–2014), English inventor and entrepreneur
Mildred Aldrich (1853–1928), American journalist and writer
Nelson W. Aldrich (1841–1915), American politician from Rhode Island
Nelson W. Aldrich Jr. (1935-2022), American editor and author
Pelham Aldrich (1844–1930), English Royal Navy officer and explorer
Pieter Aldrich (born 1965), South African tennis player
Putnam Aldrich (1904–1975), American musician and professor
Richard Aldrich (music critic) (1863–1937), American music critic
Richard Aldrich (artist) (born 1975), American painter
Richard S. Aldrich (1884–1941), American lawyer and politician
Richard W. Aldrich, American neuroscientist
Robert Aldrich (1918–1983), American film director
Robert Aldrich (bishop), Anglican bishop
Robert Aldrich (historian) (born 1954), Australian historian and writer
Ronnie Aldrich (1916–1993), British musician
Sarah Aldrich (born 1970), American actress
Stephen Aldrich (born 1941), American judge
Susannah Valentine Aldrich (1828-1915), American author and hymnwriter
Thomas A. Aldrich (born 1923), American soldier and major general
Thomas Bailey Aldrich (1836–1907), American writer
Truman H. Aldrich (1848–1932), American engineer and paleontologist
Virgil Aldrich (1903–1998), Indian–American philosopher
William Aldrich (1820–1885), American politician and representative
William F. Aldrich (1853–1925), American politician and representative
Winthrop W. Aldrich (1885–1974), American financier

See also
Aldrich (disambiguation)

References

Surnames of Old English origin